Bandırma Kırmızı B.K. is a professional basketball team that is based in Bandırma, Balıkesir Province, Turkey.

History
Bandırma Kırmızı played in the Turkish Super League, during the 2011–12.

Arena
Bandırma Kırmızı's home arena is the Kara Ali Acar Sport Hall, which has a capacity of 3,000 seats.

Season by season

References

External links
Official Website 
Eurobasket Profile
TBLStat.net Profile

Basketball teams in Turkey
Basketball teams established in 2005
Turkish Basketball Super League teams
Bandırma